La sangre y la semilla is a 1959 Argentine-Paraguayan film, directed by Alberto Du Bois. Produced in Spanish and Guaraní, it was shot in the Paraguayan city of Itauguá. It stars Argentine actress Olga Zubarry and the Paraguayan Ernesto Báez in the leading roles. Written by Augusto Roa Bastos, based on a story by Mario Halley Mora, it is a historical film set in 1870 at the end of the Paraguayan War, during the exodus of the last followers of President Francisco Solano López to Cerro Corá (1870). The film premiered on 12 November 1959.

Plot
Paquita, the widow of a Paraguayan officer, rescues a wounded sergeant who has been a companion of her husband. She takes care of him and nurtures him back to health. But they only have one hope, to keep fighting for Paraguay against the Argentine Army.

Cast
César Alvarez Blanco
Ernesto Báez
Raul Valentino Benítez
Leandro Cacavellos
Roque Centurión Miranda
Celia Elís
José Guisone
Carlos Gómez
Mercedes Jané
Mario Prono
Romualdo Quiroga
Rafael Rojas Doria
Miguel Angel Yegros
Olga Zubarry

References

External links
 
 

1950s Spanish-language films
Guaraní-language films
1959 films
Argentine historical drama films
1950s war drama films
Paraguayan historical films
1950s historical drama films
Argentine war drama films
1950s Argentine films